Michael Tumi (born 12 February 1990 in Padua) is an Italian sprinter.

Biography
He placed second at 2011 European Athletics U23 Championships in Ostrava, where he set a personal best in the 100 metres at 10.19 seconds (+0.1). He has won individual national championships four times.

In 2013, Tumi set a new Italian national record in the 60 meters, beating a 23-year-old record set by Pierfrancesco Pavoni in 1990. He won the bronze medal at the European Championships in athletics over the same distance.

National records
 60 metres indoor: 6.51 ( Ancona, 17 February 2013) - Current holder

Achievements

National titles
5 wins in the 60 metres indoor (2011, 2012, 2013, 2016, 2018)

See also
Italian records in athletics
Italy national relay team
Italian all-time top lists - 100 metres

References

External links
 

1990 births
Italian male sprinters
Living people
Athletics competitors of Centro Sportivo Aeronautica Militare
Athletics competitors of Fiamme Oro
Mediterranean Games gold medalists for Italy
Mediterranean Games bronze medalists for Italy
Athletes (track and field) at the 2013 Mediterranean Games
World Athletics Championships athletes for Italy
Mediterranean Games medalists in athletics